The Barona Group of Capitan Grande Band of Mission Indians of the Barona Reservation is a federally recognized tribe of Kumeyaay Indians, who are sometimes known as Mission Indians.

Reservations

In 1875, the tribe along with the Viejas Group of Capitan Grande Band of Mission Indians, controls the Capitan Grande Reservation, which consisted of barren, uninhabitable mountain lands. The El Capitan Reservoir, forcibly purchased from the two tribes to provide water for San Diego, submerged what habitable land existed on the reservation. The two tribes jointly control this reservation. It is undeveloped but serves as an ecological preserve.

The Barona Reservation is a federal Indian reservation located in San Diego County, California, near Lakeside and the Cleveland National Forest. It takes its name from the Mexican land grant Cañada de San Vicente y Mesa del Padre Barona, named in turn after Padre José Barona, a friar at Mission San Diego de Alcalá from 1798 until he transferred to Mission San Juan Capistrano in 1811. Much of the highland valley has good farmland, the reservation hosts several ranches, a chapel, tribal offices, community center, and ball park, created by the tribe. In 1973, 125 of the 156 enrolled members lived on the reservation. The nearest community is San Diego Country Estates, which adjoins the reservation's northeast side.

Government
The Barona Band of Mission Indians is headquartered in Lakeside, California. They are governed by a democratically elected, seven-person tribal council, who serve four-year terms. As of January 2021, the council members are:

 Raymond Welch, Chairman
 Mary Beth Glasco, Vice-Chairwoman
 Delia Castillo, Councilwoman
 Clayton Curo, Councilman
 Tawyna Phoenix, Councilwoman
 Manuel Navarro, Councilman
 Joseph Yeats, Councilman

Economic development
The tribe owns and operates the Barona Resort and Casino, AmBience Day Spa, Barona Creek Golf Club, Barona Steakhouse, Sage Café, Seasons Fresh Buffet, HoWan Noodle Shop, and several other restaurants, all in Lakeside.

Bibliography

References

External links
 Barona Band of Mission Indians, official website

Kumeyaay
California Mission Indians
Native American tribes in San Diego County, California
Native American tribes in California
Federally recognized tribes in the United States
East County (San Diego County)